Caria was an ancient region of Asia Minor.

Caria may also refer to:
Caria (Moimenta da Beira), a parish in Moimenta da Beira, Portugal
Caria, a parish in Belmonte, Portugal
Caria (butterfly), a genus of metalmark butterflies in the tribe Riodinini

See also 
 Carya